Stabæk Fotball Kvinner is Stabæk IF's women's football team, started on 23 October 2008 with a core of players from Asker.  Asker had lost its licence to play in the top league after a failure to meet financial targets, and Stabæk's chairman Mimi Berdal arranged for the new team to be formed within Stabæk IF.  The team was immediately joined by other players including Solveig Gulbrandsen.

Stabæk plays in the Toppserien, the top women's league in Norway.  The new team set an attendance record in its first match, with 1,321 spectators watching a 2–0 win over Røa, and these two teams have dominated the Norwegian league and cup competitions since then.

Stabæk won the league championship in 2010 and thus qualified for the 2011–12 UEFA Women's Champions League to debut in Europe.  The team also finished in second place to Røa in the Toppserien in 2009 and 2011, and in November 2011 won the Norwegian Cup Final.

The team played in the Champions League for the first time in 2011.  They met FFC Frankfurt in their first tie and beat them 1–0 in the home match at Nadderud Stadium, Oslo, but lost the return match in Frankfurt 4-1 a week later. They were also qualified to play in the Champions League again in 2012.

Notable former players in the team include Lise Klaveness, Ingrid Hjelmseth, Trine B. Rønning, and the national team captains of Norway and Denmark, Ingvild Stensland and Katrine Pedersen. Ada Hegerberg, the first ever recipient of the Ballon d'Or Féminin in 2018, played for Stabæk in 2012.

Recent history 
{|class="wikitable"
|-bgcolor="#efefef"
! Season
! 
! Pos.
! Pl.
! W
! D
! L
! GS
! GA
! P
!Cup
!Notes
|-
|2009
|Toppserien
|align=right bgcolor=silver|2
|align=right|22||align=right|16||align=right|5||align=right|1
|align=right|83||align=right|15||align=right|53
||Third round
|
|-
|2010
|Toppserien
|align=right bgcolor=gold|1
|align=right|22||align=right|17||align=right|5||align=right|0
|align=right|72||align=right|8||align=right|56
|Quarter-final
|
|-
|2011 
|Toppserien
|align=right bgcolor=silver|2
|align=right|22||align=right|16||align=right|3||align=right|3
|align=right|57||align=right|10||align=right|51
|bgcolor=gold|Winner
|
|-
|2012 
|Toppserien
|align=right bgcolor=silver|2
|align=right|22||align=right|15||align=right|5||align=right|2
|align=right|70||align=right|21||align=right|50
|bgcolor=gold|Winner
|
|-
|2013 
|Toppserien
|align=right bgcolor=gold|1
|align=right|22||align=right|17||align=right|4||align=right|1
|align=right|64||align=right|9||align=right|55
|bgcolor=gold|Winner
|
|-
|2014 
|Toppserien
|align=right bgcolor=silver|2
|align=right|22||align=right|16||align=right|4||align=right|2
|align=right|62||align=right|19||align=right|52
||Quarter-final
|
|-
|2015 
|Toppserien
|align=right|4
|align=right|22||align=right|10||align=right|7||align=right|5
|align=right|32||align=right|17||align=right|37
||Semi-final
|
|-
|2016 
|Toppserien
|align=right bgcolor=cc9966|3
|align=right|22||align=right|12||align=right|6||align=right|4
|align=right|39||align=right|17||align=right|42
||Quarter-final
|
|-
|2017 
|Toppserien
|align=right bgcolor=cc9966|3
|align=right|22||align=right|13||align=right|4||align=right|5
|align=right|46||align=right|23||align=right|43
||Quarter-final
|
|-
|2018 
|Toppserien
|align=right |8
|align=right|22||align=right|7||align=right|2||align=right|13
|align=right|29||align=right|37||align=right|23
||Third round
|
|-
|2019
|Toppserien
|align=right bgcolor="#FFCCCC"| 11
|align=right|22||align=right|3||align=right|4||align=right|15
|align=right|16||align=right|43||align=right|13
||Third round
|Relegated to 1. divisjon
|-
|2020 
|1. divisjon
|align=right bgcolor=#DDFFDD| 1
|align=right|18||align=right|17||align=right|0||align=right|1
|align=right|68||align=right|13||align=right|51
||Quarter-final
|Promoted to Toppserien
|-
|2021
|Toppserien
|align=right |7
|align=right|18||align=right|5||align=right|2||align=right|11
|align=right|15||align=right|36||align=right|17
||Third round
|
|-
|rowspan=2|2022
|rowspan=2|Toppserien
|rowspan=2 align=right | 4
|align=right|18||align=right|8||align=right|3||align=right|7
|align=right|23||align=right|22||align=right|27
|rowspan=2 bgcolor=silver|Final
|rowspan=2|
|-
|align=right|6||align=right|0||align=right|0||align=right|6
|align=right|2||align=right|20||align=right|0
|}
Source:

Achievements
Toppserien
Champions (2): 2010, 2013
Runners-up (4): 2009, 2011, 2012, 2014
Third (2): 2016, 2017
 Norwegian Women's Cup
Winners (3): 2011, 2012, 2013
Runners-up (1): 2022

Players

Current squad

Former players

References

External links
 Official site
 Supporter pages (Stabæk Support)
 Profile at UEFA

Stabæk Fotball
Women's football clubs in Norway
Association football clubs established in 1912
Sport in Bærum
1912 establishments in Norway